Samuda may refer to:

Isaac de Sequeira Samuda (died 1743), British physician
Jacob Samuda (1811–1844), Jewish English civil engineer born in London
Jacqueline Samuda, Canadian actress, director and writer
Joseph d'Aguilar Samuda (1813–1885), English civil engineer and politician
Karl Samuda, Jamaican politician
Matthew Samuda, Jamaican politician

See also
Samuda Brothers, engineering and ship building firm at Cubitt Town on the Isle of Dogs in London, founded by Jacob and Joseph d'Aguilar Samuda
Samuda Estate, on the east side of Manchester Road, in Cubitt Town on the Isle of Dogs